Sucharzewo may refer to:

Sucharzewo, Mogilno County, Poland
Sucharzewo, Śrem County, Poland